Pervomaysky is a rural locality (a settlement) and the administrative center of Pervomayskoye Rural Settlement, Ertilsky District, Voronezh Oblast, Russia. The population was 880 as of 2010. There are 21 streets.

Geography 
Pervomaysky is located 22 km southwest of Ertil (the district's administrative centre) by road. Ertil is the nearest rural locality.

References 

Rural localities in Ertilsky District